is a 2010 Japanese film directed by Sion Sono. Cold Fish premiered at the 67th Venice International Film Festival on September 7, 2010, and received the best screenplay award in the Fantastic Features section at Fantastic Fest 2010. The film was released as part of the Bloody Disgusting Selects line.

Premise
Nobuyuki Shamoto is the quiet and unambitious owner of a Shizuoka shop specializing in selling tropical fish. His home life leaves much to be desired, as his daughter Mitsuko is rebellious and physically abuses her stepmother Taeko, his second wife. One night Nobuyuki is summoned when Mitsuko is caught shoplifting at a local supermarket. Yukio Murata, a patron at the supermarket, persuades the manager to drop the matter and invites Nobuyuki to visit his own, larger tropical fish shop. During an impromptu tour of Yukio's shop, Nobuyuki meets his wife, Aiko. Stating that fate brought the two men together, the gregarious Yukio convinces Nobuyuki to go into business with him. Yukio also takes on Mitsuko as a worker in his shop.

The film is loosely based on the exploits of two Tokyo serial killers, Sekine Gen and Hiroko Kazama, a husband and wife duo who owned a pet shop and murdered at least four people.

Cast
 Mitsuru Fukikoshi as Nobuyuki Syamoto
 Denden as Yukio Murata
 Asuka Kurosawa as Aiko Murata
 Megumi Kagurazaka as Taeko Syamoto
 Hikari Kajiwara as Mitsuko Syamoto
 Tetsu Watanabe as Takayasu TsuTsui

Production
Following Alien vs Ninja and Mutant Girls Squad, Cold Fish is the third film to be released by Nikkatsu's Sushi Typhoon, their gore-themed series.
Director and writer Sion Sono was influenced by Japanese crime cases while developing Cold Fish, specifically about an actual killing spree committed by a dog kennel owner in the 1990s (the story of the film involves a family of three that becomes entangled in a string of ongoing murders perpetrated by a tropical fish salesman in Shizuoka Prefecture). Sono also wanted to "depict a sense of total hopelessness" which he felt is "lacking in Japanese films."

Release
Cold Fish premiered at the 67th Venice International Film Festival on September 7, 2010. It was also shown at film festivals in Pusan and at the Toronto International Film Festival where it received its North American premiere. Cold Fish won the best screenplay award in the Fantastic Features section at Fantastic Fest 2010. It was released in Japan on January 29, 2011.

Reception
Film Business Asia gave Cold Fish an 8 out of 10 rating praising the actor Denden who without his "tour-de-force performance...Cold Fish may never have worked." The review went on to state that "Though there's considerable gore on display, it's largely cartoonish. Cold Fish is not so much a blood-and-guts horror movie, more a danse macabre about social breakdown."

In the United Kingdom, Total Film gave the film a three out of five rating, suggesting that plot twists and black comedy offered welcome reprieve from the "largely hysterical acting and rivers of viscera."
The Guardian found the film to be "fairly ordinary" in comparison to Sono's other works and felt that the film was too long. Radio Times gave the film three out of five stars, praising the acting from Denden, Fukikoshi and Kurosawa and Shinya Kimura's photography and Takashi Matsuzuka's production design which made up for "some overindulgent directorial moments".

Notes

External links
  
 
 

2010 films
2010 horror films
Horror films based on actual events
Japanese horror thriller films
2010 horror thriller films
Nikkatsu films
Japanese serial killer films
Films directed by Sion Sono
2010s serial killer films
2010s Japanese films
2010s Japanese-language films